Federal Government College, Jos (FGC Jos) is a Federal Government owned secondary school, run by the Federal Ministry of Education, Nigeria. It is a Unity School that prepares young boys and girls for the future. FGC Jos is located Along Market road, Jos in Jos the capital city of Plateau State in the northeastern region of Nigeria, West Africa.

References 

Secondary schools in Nigeria
Government schools in Nigeria
Jos